Valmy SAS is a French manufacturer of personal protective equipment, based near Lyon, France.  Its products include surgical masks and disposable hygiene equipment. It is a subsidiary of Segetex.

In 2020, the company was involved in a controversy regarding the supply of protective masks to the United Kingdom during the COVID-19 pandemic.

References 

Manufacturing companies of France
Medical technology companies of France